Kenny Logan is a former Scottish international lawn bowler.

Bowls career
He won a gold medal in the triples at the 1996 World Outdoor Bowls Championship in Adelaide. In 1995, he won the Hong Kong International Bowls Classic pairs title with Alex Marshall.

Family
His father Rennie Logan was also a Scottish international lawn bowler.

References

Scottish male bowls players
Living people
Bowls World Champions
Year of birth missing (living people)